"Obsession" is a 1983 song by Holly Knight and Michael Des Barres, covered in 1984 by the group Animotion. The song hit number six in the United States, and number five in the United Kingdom in early 1985, helped by a distinctive video that MTV played frequently. "Obsession" also hit the Top 40 on the US dance chart, twice: once in 1984 (the single reached No. 35 the week ending November 24);<ref>The 12 single entered the Billboard Dance charts the week ending October 27,1984</ref> then in 1986, as a double-sided hit, along with the track "I Engineer".

Background

Cowriter Michael Des Barres was recovering from a heroin addiction in 1983, so "Obsession" was a familiar word to him. But although drugs were familiar territory to him, he wanted to write about something that would appeal to a much wider audience, like love. The line, "Like a butterfly, a wild butterfly, I will collect you and capture you" was inspired by The Collector, a movie Des Barres had watched about a man who kidnapped a beautiful woman. Cowriter Holly Knight would often practice or write riffs on the bass E-string of her guitar, which spawned the bass rhythm of "Obsession".

History

"Obsession" was originally written and recorded as a duet by songwriter Holly Knight and musician Michael Des Barres in 1983. This version was played in the 1983 film A Night in Heaven, during a scene in which Christopher Atkins bumps and grinds in Lesley Ann Warren's face in sync with the rhythm of the song. The song was featured on the film's soundtrack and was also featured in the theatrical trailer to the 1986 film 9½ Weeks, starring Mickey Rourke and Kim Basinger.

The Los Angeles-based synthpop band Animotion recorded a version of the tune for their self-titled debut album, released in 1984.  This version became a success, and it remains Animotion's biggest hit.

Animotion's version is featured in the 2002 video game Grand Theft Auto: Vice City on the fictional in-game new wave radio station "Wave 103" as well as in a Strip Club in the game called "The Pole Position Club".  It has also been used as the theme song for World Wrestling Federation's Saturday Night's Main Event (aired on NBC as the introduction theme from May 1985 - Jan 1988) and FashionTelevisionChannel, as well as MTV's House of Style.  The song has been used as the opening theme for the internationally syndicated Canadian program FT - FashionTelevision since it premiered in 1986. The Animotion version was also featured in 1985 episodes of the daytime soap operas Days Of Our Lives and Guiding Light. It also featured in the 2016 video game Call of Duty: Infinite Warfare as a part of the soundtrack to the zombies mode map "Zombies in Spaceland".

The song is featured in the 1989 video Don Cherry's Rock'Em Sock'em Hockey. 

It was also featured prominently in the 2018 Australian film The Second, the first feature film ever produced by an Australian streaming service (Stan). The movie, about a troubling incident in the past of a successful novelist, used the song throughout to highlight the themes of jealousy, envy, and most obviously obsession.

The song features in the American Dad! episode "Shell Game" (2018).

Various artists have covered the song, including The Azoic in 2004, the Sugababes, Karen O from The Yeah Yeah Yeahs recorded a version which was the theme to a tv show called Flesh and Bone

The song is featured in a scene in the 2022 film Fresh, in which Sebastian Stan’s character dances to the song while preparing human meat for consumption.

The song is used in a teaser trailer for the upcoming Ti West film MaXXXine.

Music video
The music video features the Animotion band members — focusing mostly on the two lead singers, Bill Wadhams and Astrid Plane — dressed in various costumes (such as Mark Antony and Cleopatra) while lip-synching and dancing to the song next to a swimming pool and inside a luxury house in the Hollywood neighborhood.

Track listings

 7": Mercury / 880 266-7 (US), PH34 (UK) 
Side one
 "Obsession" - 3:58	
Side two
 "Turn Around" - 3:54

 12": Mercury / 880 266-1 (US), PH3412 (UK) 
Side one
 "Obsession (Dance Remix)" - 6:00	
Side two
 "Obsession (Special Dub Mix)" - 5:30

Charts

Weekly charts

Year-end charts

Sugababes version

English girl group Sugababes covered "Obsession" for their fourth studio album Taller in More Ways (2005). Group member Heidi Range initially recorded it as a demo with Ashley Hamilton, although the Sugababes later decided to record it as a group. It was produced by Dallas Austin, one of the album's primary producers. The cover is similar to the original and had a polarizing effect on critics; some criticised it as mediocre, while others called it one of the album's standout tracks. The Sugababes performed it on their tours in support of Taller in More Ways and Overloaded: The Singles Collection (2006).

Background and production
The Sugababes' version of "Obsession" was produced by Dallas Austin, who collaborated with the Sugababes on various tracks on the album. Group member Heidi Range initially recorded "Obsession" as a demo with Ashley Hamilton, although the Sugababes later decided to record it as a group. They spoke to Austin about their desire to record the song, and according to Range, "he was made up, because it’s one of his favourite songs." "Obsession" was mixed by Jeremy Wheatley at TwentyOne Studios, London, with assistance from Richard Edgeler. It was engineered collectively by Rick Shepphard, Graham Marsh (producer), Ian Rossiter and Owen Clark. Tony Reyes provides background vocals for the song. "Obsession" was recorded at DARP Studios, in Atlanta & Home Recordings, London. It derives from the genres of synthpop and electronic rock. K. Ross Hoffman of AllMusic described it as "sugary synth pop". Talia Kraines of BBC called the cover an "exact reworking" of the original. The instrumentation consists of an electric guitar, bass guitar, drums and keys. Alex Roginski of the Sydney Morning Herald noted that the song "thumps out analog synth and the glittering chord progressions of a 1980s nightclub".

Critical reception
The Sugababes' cover of "Obsession" had a polarizing effect on critics. Harry Rubenstein of The Jerusalem Post felt that the group added nothing new to the track and instead stuck to a "straight up" cover, which he considered disappointing. Nick Southall of Stylus Magazine regarded it as a "pleasant but unspectacular cover". A journalist from The Scotsman considered it a "less engaging non-song" and criticized the group's decision to cover it. Alexis Petridis of The Guardian felt that the Sugababes' version "sands off the edges rather than amps up the lunacy", and concluded: "what's left is like 1980s night at karaoke". On the positive side, BBC's Talia Kraines named it the album's standout pop track. Similarly, Peter Robinson of The Observer described the "spirited gambol" as one of the album's highlights. Anna Britten from Yahoo! Music thought that the cover was even better than the original, and appreciated the "gorgeous, perfumed menace on the song's subject" which she felt resembled Sin City's "gun-toting Valkyrie-hookers". Simon Price of The Independent praised the song as "instant pop", and a writer from The Liverpool Daily Post & Echo considered it a "brilliantly seductive reworking" of the original.

Live performances
"Obsession" was included in the set list for the Sugababes' tour supporting Taller in More Ways. It was one of three tracks from the album that was not released as a single to be performed on the tour. Gurdip Thandi of Birmingham Mail regarded the song's performance at the NIA Academy as "polished". "Obsession" was also included in the set list for their 2007 tour in support of Overloaded: The Singles Collection, the group's 2006 greatest hits album.

Credits and personnel
Recording
Recorded at DARP Studios, Atlanta & Home Recordings, London

Personnel
Songwriting – Holly Knight, Michael Des Barres
Production – Dallas Austin
Engineering – Rick Shepphard
Assistant recording engineering – Graham Marsh (producer), Ian Rossiter, Owen Clark
Mixing – Jeremy Wheatley for 365 Artists at TwentyOne Studio, London
Guitar and bass guitar – Tony Reyes
Drums and keys – Dallas Austin
Background vocals – Tony Reyes

Credits adapted from the liner notes of Taller in More Ways'', Universal Island Records.

References

1983 songs
1985 singles
Animotion songs
Island Records singles
Mercury Records singles
Songs about stalking
Songs written by Holly Knight
Songs written by Michael Des Barres